The siege of Masada was one of the final events in the First Jewish–Roman War, occurring from 72 to 73 CE on and around a hilltop in present-day Israel.

The siege is known to history via a single source, Flavius Josephus, a Jewish rebel leader captured by the Romans, in whose service he became a historian.  According to Josephus the long siege by the troops of the Roman Empire led to the mass suicide of the Sicarii rebels and resident Jewish families of the Masada fortress.

Background 

Masada has been described as "a lozenge-shaped table-mountain" that is "lofty, isolated, and to all appearance impregnable". Historically, the fortress could be reached only by a single pathway that was too narrow for men to walk abreast. This pathway was named "the Snake" for the way it twists and zig-zags to the summit. Masada was named as the place where David rested after fleeing from his father-in-law, King Saul.

Flavius Josephus, a Jew born and raised in Jerusalem, is the only historian to provide a detailed account of the First Jewish–Roman War and the only person who recorded what happened on Masada. After being captured during the Siege of Yodfat and then freed by Vespasian, Josephus chronicled the Roman campaign. Josephus presumably based his narration on the field commentaries of the Roman commanders.

According to Josephus, Masada was first constructed by the Hasmoneans. Between 37 and 31 BCE Herod the Great fortified it as a refuge for himself in the event of a revolt. In 66 CE, at the beginning of the First Jewish–Roman War, a group of Jewish extremists called the Sicarii overcame the Roman garrison of Masada and settled there. The Sicarii were commanded by Eleazar ben Ya'ir, and in 70 CE they were joined by additional Sicarii and their families expelled from Jerusalem by the Jewish population with whom the Sicarii were in conflict. Shortly thereafter, following the Roman siege of Jerusalem and subsequent destruction of the Second Temple, additional members of the Sicarii and many Jewish families fled Jerusalem and settled on the mountaintop, with the Sicarii using it as a refuge and base for raiding the surrounding countryside. According to modern interpretations of Josephus, the Sicarii were an extremist splinter group of the Zealots and were equally antagonistic to both Romans and other Jewish groups. It was the Zealots, in contrast to the Sicarii, who carried the main burden of the rebellion, which opposed Roman rule of Judea.

According to Josephus, on Passover, the Sicarii raided Ein Gedi, a nearby Jewish settlement, and killed 700 of its inhabitants.

Archaeology indicates that the Sicarii modified some of the structures they found at Masada; these include a building that was modified to function as a synagogue (it may in fact have been a synagogue to begin with), although it did not contain a mikvah or the benches found in other early synagogues. It is one of the oldest synagogues in Israel.

Josephus' narrative 

In 72 CE, the Roman governor of Judaea, Lucius Flavius Silva, led Roman legion X Fretensis, a number of auxiliary units and Jewish prisoners of war, totaling some 15,000 men and women (of whom an estimated 8,000 to 9,000 were fighting men) to lay siege to the 960 people in Masada. The Roman legion surrounded Masada and built a circumvallation wall, before commencing construction of a siege ramp against the western face of the plateau, moving thousands of tons of stones and beaten earth to do so. Josephus does not record any attempts by the Sicarii to counterattack the besiegers during this process, a significant difference from his accounts of other sieges of the revolt.

The ramp was completed in the spring of 73, after probably two to three months of siege. A giant siege tower with a battering ram was constructed and moved laboriously up the completed ramp, while the Romans assaulted the wall, discharging "a volley of blazing torches against ... a wall of timber", allowing the Romans to finally breach the wall of the fortress on April 16, 73 CE. When the Romans entered the fortress, however, they found it to be "a citadel of death". The Jewish rebels had set all the buildings but the food storerooms ablaze and had killed each other, declaring "a glorious death ... preferable to a life of infamy".

According to Josephus, "The Jews hoped that all of their nation beyond the Euphrates would join together with them to raise an insurrection", but in the end there were only 960 Jewish Zealots who fought the Roman army at Masada. When these Zealots were trapped on top of Masada with nowhere to run, Josephus tells us that the Zealots believed "it [was] by the will of God, and by necessity, that [they] are to die."

Historical interpretations
According to Shaye Cohen, archaeology shows that Josephus' account is "incomplete and inaccurate" and contradicted by the "skeletons in the cave, and the numerous separate fires". Cohen speculates that "some Jews killed themselves, some fought to the death, and some attempted to hide and escape. The Romans were in no mood to take prisoners and massacred all whom they found."

According to Kenneth Atkinson, there is no "archaeological evidence that Masada's defenders committed mass suicide."

According to archaeologist Eric H. Cline, Josephus' narrative is impossible because the Romans would have immediately pressed their advantage, leaving no time for Eleazar's speech or the mass suicides. Instead, Cline proposes that the defenders were massacred by Romans.

Legacy 
The siege of Masada is often revered in modern Israel as "a symbol of Jewish heroism". According to Klara Palotai, "Masada became a symbol for a heroic 'last stand' for the State of Israel and played a major role for Israel in forging national identity". To Israel, it symbolized the courage of the warriors of Masada, the strength they showed when they were able to keep hold of Masada for almost three years, and their choice of death over slavery in their struggle against an aggressive empire. Masada had become "the performance space of national heritage", the site of military ceremonies. Palotai states how Masada "developed a special 'love affair' with archeology" because the site had drawn people from all around the world to help locate the remnants of the fortress and the battle that occurred there.

See also 
 Jewish–Roman wars
 The Antagonists
 Masada (miniseries)
 Mass suicide
 Miła 18
 Puputan (mass suicide in Bali)
 Teutons: Mass suicide of the women of the Teutones
 Zealots (Judea)
 Destruction of Psara, a similar heroic mass suicide in Greek history

References

Further reading 
 Ben-Yehuda, N., 2002, Sacrificing Truth: Archaeology and The Myth of Masada
 
 Lane, Jodie (2015). The Siege of Masada. Brisbane: InHouse Publishing. . (FICTION)
 
 
 Ehud Netzer, The Rebels' Archives at Masada, Israel Exploration Journal, Vol. 54, No. 2 (2004), pp. 218–229
 Barry Schwartz, Yael Zerubavel, Bernice M. Barnett, George Steiner, The Recovery of Masada: A Study in Collective Memory, The Sociological Quarterly, Vol. 27, No. 2 (Summer, 1986), pp. 147–164

73
74
70s in the Roman Empire
70s conflicts
Jews and Judaism in the Roman Empire
 
Mass suicides
Sieges involving the Roman Empire
Last stands
First Jewish–Roman War

fr:Massada#Histoire
sv:Masada#Masada under antiken